The 1970 Nebraska Cornhuskers football team represented the University of Nebraska–Lincoln in the 1970 NCAA University Division football season. The team was coached by Bob Devaney and played their home games in Memorial Stadium in Lincoln.  The Huskers went 11–0–1 to win the first of two consecutive national championships.

Overview
The Huskers started the season at #9 and tied #3 USC in Los Angeles in the second game of the season.  After winning their next nine games, including all seven in the Big 8, Nebraska was  ranked third in the nation entering the 1971 Orange Bowl against #5 LSU of the SEC. Top-ranked Texas and #2 Ohio State both lost their bowl games earlier in the day and a 17-12 Nebraska victory that night in Miami gave the Huskers their first AP national championship.

Through the 1973 season, the final UPI coaches poll was released in early December, before the bowl games. In 1970 it picked Texas as national champion on December 8, before the Longhorns' 24-11 loss to Notre Dame in the 1971 Cotton Bowl in Dallas on New Year's Day. Notre Dame (10-1) finished second to Nebraska (11-0-1) in the final AP writers poll, released after the bowls in early January.

The 1970 Cornhuskers championship season was notable for Devaney's rotation of two quarterbacks - Van Brownson and Jerry Tagge - in every game throughout the season.

Schedule

Roster

Coaching staff

Game summaries

Wake Forest

Wake Forest hit first with a field goal thanks to a Nebraska fumble, but by the half it was the Cornhuskers 28-5.  The Demon Deacons would go on to win the ACC title, their last until 2006.

USC

Nebraska entered the game as a two-touchdown underdog to a USC squad fresh off a 42-21 whipping of Alabama in Birmingham, but never trailed the Trojans during the course of the game.  Each team traded touchdowns, and each team missed opportunities for the win, right up to USC's incomplete 50-yard pass on the last play of the game.

Ironically, USC aided Nebraska's national championship push by defeating then-No. 2 Notre Dame 38-28 at Los Angeles in the regular season finale. The Trojans came into the rivalry just 5-4-1, while the Fighting Irish was 9-0.

Army

Nebraska owned the day, shutting out Army 28-0 in an otherwise unremarkable game.

Minnesota

Bob Devaney's record against the Big 10 was extended to 9-0 as the Cornhuskers had little trouble with Minnesota after running ahead 28-10 before the half.

Missouri

Nebraska scored only 7 points in the first half, and Missouri matched it before the half.  The subsequent defensive battle continued through into the 4th quarter before the Cornhuskers broke away with an additional 14 points, one from a 48-yard punt return touchdown.

Kansas

Nebraska was surprised to find themselves behind 10-20 with 10 minutes left in the 1st half, but battled back to take the lead with two more touchdowns before the break, and never let Kansas score again as they cruised to a 41-20 final.

Oklahoma State

Nebraska piled up 65 points, its highest total since 1922, and held Oklahoma State to just 64 ground yards as the Cornhuskers made short work of the Cowboys.

Colorado

Nebraska pulled out in front right away with a 12-0 1st quarter lead, but stubborn Colorado fought back and trailed the Cornhuskers by only 13-15 in the 4th quarter - after missing a 2-point conversion that would have tied the game - before Nebraska decided to stop the uprising with two touchdowns in the last 10 minutes to pull away.

Iowa State

The game was not as close as the score indicates, as Iowa State put up two late touchdowns against Nebraska reserves in the 4th quarter after the Cornhuskers had run up a 54-17 lead with 5 minutes remaining to play.

Kansas State

Kansas State came to Lincoln with hopes of a Big 8 title opportunity, but they were not prepared for the domination that Nebraska would show them in a convincing defeat.  The Wildcats managed only two touchdowns, one of which came with 5 minutes remaining in the 4th against the Nebraska reserves.  At one point in the game, the Cornhuskers exploded for 27 points in less than 4 minutes, pushing their lead out to 51-7.

Oklahoma

Nebraska locked up their first unbeaten regular season since 1965 by coming from behind twice to get the win over stubborn Oklahoma.  It wasn't until 7:42 remained in the 4th quarter that Nebraska pulled ahead by a touchdown to settle the final score.

LSU

Third-ranked Nebraska jumped to a 10-0 lead in the first quarter and lead 10-3 at halftime, but #5 LSU fought back to make a game of it, pulling ahead on a field goal at the end of the 3rd quarter to get to 12-10.  With over eight minutes remaining, Jerry Tagge jumped over the pile from the 1-yard line for the game's final points, and the Blackshirts held on the rest of the way to preserve the win.  Top-ranked Texas and #2 Ohio State both lost their bowl games earlier in the day, which allowed the Huskers to claim their first national championship.

Rankings

Awards

1970 team players in the NFL

The 1970 Nebraska Cornhuskers seniors selected in the 1971 NFL Draft:

The 1970 Nebraska Cornhuskers juniors selected in the following year's 1972 NFL Draft:

The 1970 Nebraska Cornhuskers sophomores selected in the 1973 NFL Draft:

NFL and pro players
The following 1970 Nebraska players joined a professional team as draftees or free agents.

References

Nebraska
Nebraska Cornhuskers football seasons
College football national champions
Big Eight Conference football champion seasons
Orange Bowl champion seasons
College football undefeated seasons
Nebraska Cornhuskers football